Yacht transport is the shipping of a yacht to a destination instead of sailing or motoring it. Yacht transport is an alternative to the traditional passaging (sailing or motoring) to reach desired
destinations around the globe.   Transport when compared to passaging is cost-effective, safer and improves availability.

For many dedicated sailors, passaging or an ocean crossing is a rite of passage, but it comes with many risks and expenses.  For many serious cruisers, financial, business and family considerations argue against the long-term full-time dedication that ocean crossings require.  Yacht transport becomes an alternative when the destination and cruising (maritime) is more important than the passaging.

Yacht transport generally eliminates costly, time-consuming, and dangerous difficult ocean crossings, opening up cruising to more people.   Container cruising, one approach to yacht transport, is significantly less expensive and has greater flexibility with respect to timing and destinations.   The drawback to container cruising is that there are a limited number of yachts 
that have the necessary  to fit in the  standard container.

Transport methods

Overland transport
Small boats being transported short distances are often moved using private or commercial trailers.  As the boat size and the over-land distances increase, commercial trailer services are typically employed by boat owners to move vessels.  Insurance coverage, transport permits, trailer safety and proper preparation and loading of the vessel and contents are aspects commercial boat/yacht services provide.

Semi-submersible ships (SSS)
 

Semi-submersible ships were developed to move large (project) cargoes, but have now been adapted for yacht shipping.  These ships are semi-submersible.  This means that by ballasting, they can submerge their cargo holds.  Yachts motor under their own power into the flooded cargo holds to load.  Once all the yachts are in position and secured, divers weld hull supports into place.  The ship deballasts and sails away.  At discharge port arrival, the process is reversed, with the ship ballasting, allowing the yachts to exit. Semi-submersible shipping is arranged by the owners.

Deck cargo

Yachts can be shipped as deck cargo.  Yachts are loaded directly from the water or from shore.  Yachts are loaded by ship or by shore cranes in cradles either supplied by the carrier or the owner.  For conventional deck cargo shipping, the rigging is left intact.  Deck cargo shipping is normally arranged directly with the shipping lines or with brokers who specialize in yacht deck cargo shipping.

Container shipment

Yachts are also transported by container ships.  Because container freight is sold on the basis of total enclosed volume, efforts are made to decrease that volume, including de-rigging the boat. If a yacht meets the restrictions imposed by container sizing, typically  x  x , container shipping is an alternative. Container shipping is arranged through freight forwarders.  

Costs include the cost of preparation, cradles, documentation, and customs and other government fees. Container shipment costs are almost independent of distance shipped and depend more on imbalances in container locations.

Scheduling

The Semi-submersible ships travel on fixed schedules over popular routes such as to and from the US, Europe, the Caribbean, and Pacific Ocean destinations.

While in theory, deck cargoes can be arranged between any two ports and at any time, costs are reduced if a number of yachts are shipped together. Because most ships are non-US flag carriers, they are forbidden by law to transport cargoes between US ports.  To comply with the law, they load or discharge in Canada, the Bahamas or Mexico.  Container shipping offers complete flexibility with respect to ports and timing.

Security

The locked and sealed container provides the best overall security. Since the semi-submersible ships are dedicated to yacht transport, they also offer a secure environment. In addition to theft, another potential problem is partial or total losses at sea. Probability of losses is low, reflected by the lower cost of insurance.

The increasing cost of fuel, the convenience, and the ability to go anywhere make yacht transport an attractive alternative.

See also 
 Roll-on/roll-off

References

Yachting
Transport by cargo